Shantilal O Projapoti Rohoshyo is an Indian Bengali mystery-thriller film, directed by Pratim D. Gupta. The film starred Ritwick Chakraborty, Paoli Dam and Goutam Ghose in lead roles. This was released on 16 August 2019 under the banner of Platoon One Films.

Plot 
Shantilal, a deadbeat weather reporter of a Kolkata based newspaper, who is in his late 30s, still unmarried and lives with his mother. Glamorous actress Nandita now wants to venture into politics. While Shantilal is watching old porn film he finds body part of Nandita in a clipping of famous porn star of Padma Pictures, Miss Roshni. Being curious he starts investigation about the porn film production house, Padma Pictures in Chennai. Shantilal moves Kolkata to Chennai to Singapore to find Roshni. But no one want to speak about Padma Pictures.

Cast 
 Ritwick Chakraborty as Shantilal
 Paoli Dam as Nandita
 Goutam Ghose as editor of The Sentinel
 Akshay Kapoor as Hindol
 Srijit Mukherji as Praffula
 Ambarish Bhattacharya as Rocket Ronjon
 Shankar Chakraborty as Shantilal's friend
 Alakananda Ray as Shantilal's mother
 Chitrangada Chakraborty as Candy
 Sanghasri Sinha Mitra as Roshni

Production

Development 
The screenplay of the film was selected for the 2013 Indian edition of the prestigious Sundance Lab, organised by Sundance Institute, where Pratim got to discuss and dissect his script with international writers and directors like Asif Kapadia, Bill Wheeler, Joshua Marston, Carlos Cuaron and Marti Noxon. The film was titled Ink at that time.

The script was subsequently read by actor Irrfan Khan who wished to direct the film for private television channel. Pratim declined Irrfan because he wished to make the film himself.

Casting 
This is the fourth collaboration of Pratim and Ritwick after Shaheb Bibi Golaam, Maacher Jhol and Ahare Mon. The film also marks the fourth collaboration between the director and Paoli Dam. They have previously worked together in Maacher Jhol, Ahare Mon and the telefilm Mirchi Malini.

Filming 
Shooting for the film started in Kolkata in 2018 when the premiere of the film Guptodhoner Sandhane was used by Pratim to shoot a sequence for his film.

Release
The film was released theatrically on 16 August 2019.

Soundtrack

The songs for Shantilal O Projapoti Rohoshyo have been composed by Arko and the lyrics have been penned by Arko, Ritam Sen and Pratim himself. The music rights have been acquired by Zee Music Company.

References

External links
 
Bengali-language Indian films
2010s Bengali-language films
2019 films
Indian mystery thriller films